South Bay is a bay in the Laguna Madre in Texas separated from the Gulf of Mexico by Brazos Island.

Depiction of Texas Rio Grande Valley Seacoast

See also
Brazos Santiago Pass
Port Isabel, Texas
Port of Brownsville

References

External links
 
 
  
 
 

Bays of Texas
Bodies of water of Cameron County, Texas